Frank Henry Penney (7 January 1914 – 19 January 2009) was an Australian rules footballer who played with North Melbourne in the Victorian Football League (VFL).

Penney served in the Australian Army during World War II after enlisting in Geraldton, Western Australia.

Notes

External links 

1914 births
2009 deaths
Australian rules footballers from Victoria (Australia)
North Melbourne Football Club players